Ramesh Narayan (born 3 November 1959) is an Indian classical vocalist, composer and music producer who works predominantly in Malayalam cinema. He belongs to the Mewati gharana of Hindustani classical music.  Narayan began his initial training in Carnatic music and later mastered the classical Hindustani style under the renowned Pandit Jasraj.

Narayan began his career composing score music for documentaries, films and Indian television programs in Hindi, Malayalam and Tamil. He composed and sung the national integration song Saur Mandal Mein Tim Tim in 1996, directed by Jnanpith Award laureate M.T. Vasudevan Nair for Lok Seva Sanchar Parishad. Narayan's film-scoring career began in the early 1990s with the Malayalam film Magrib. His notable works include Garshom, Meghamalhar, Saira, Makalkku, Rathri Mazha, Paradesi (2007 film), Manjadikuru Adaminte Makan Abu Veettilekkulla Vazhi, Makaramanju, Edavappathy, Ennu Ninte Moideen, Suryakantha etc.

Narayan has earned National Film Awards, four Kerala State Film Awards, two Kerala Film Critics Association Awards, four Kerala state Television awards, two Kerala State Television Critics Award, two Madrid Imagine India Film festival Award. In 2007, he received the Indian Music Academy Award for popularizing Hindustani classical music in Kerala from the then President of India Dr. A. P. J. Abdul Kalam.

Narayan became popular by performing a 36-hour vocal recital as part of celebrating the 100 years of Indian Cinema at the Film and Television Institute of India, Pune. This performance got him an entry to the Limca Book of Records 2013 for completing the 24 hour raga cycle.

Early life
Narayan was born in Kuthuparamba, Kannur, Kerala in a family of Carnatic musicians. He received his early lessons in music from his parents. His father Narayan Bhagavathar was a Carnatic musician and his mother Narayani Amma was musical as well. The artistic ambience the family during his early childhood left a lasting impression on him and inspired Narayan to pursue his training in Carnatic music until the age of 20.

During his university years at the Government Music College, Chitoor, Narayan was drawn to Hindustani music. His brother Ramdas, who was based in Pune, supported his dream to study Hindustani music and introduced Narayan to the city of Pune.

Career
Upon moving to Pune, he learnt Sitar under the tutelage of Satchidananda Phadke, a disciple of sitar virtuoso Ravi Shankar. After learning sitar, he joined the Akhil Bharatiya Gandharva Mahavidyalaya to study Hindustani vocal, and took his "Visharad" degree. Narayan said that he "felt entranced by the style of Pandit Jasraj" and decide to hone his talent and technique under Jasraj, who belongs to the Mewati Gharana. Pandit Jasraj gave him rigorous training for more than seven years in the "subtler aspects of music". Narayan accompanied Pandit Jasraj during several of his concerts.
One of his feats is a 30-hour concert he performed as a dedication to his father, the late Narayana Bhagavathar, and to Pandit Motiram, an exponent of the Mewati gharana.

Narayan has composed music for feature films and television serials such as Gharshom, Elayum Mullum, Magrib, Meghamalhar, Makalkku, Anyar and Sheelabathi.

His latest work include a ghazal song Nee poyathil pinne written by Jose Manuel Motha in 2020.

Personal life

Ramesh Narayan is accompanied at many of his concerts by his wife Hema. She is a Carnatic musician and was also a student of Pandit Jasraj for a short period. Ramesh Narayan has two daughters, Madhuvanthi and Madhushree who both musicians. Narayan established the Pandit Mothiram Narayan Sangeeth Vidyalay in 1996, at Thiruvananthapuram to foster appreciation for Hindustani Classical Music. Inaugurated by Pandit Jasraj, it's the only music school in India to be associated with Mewati Gharana.

Original scores

Discography 

 Nandagopalam
 Rudra
 Mridumalhar
 Ayyappa Sahasra Namam
 Shivoham
 Swati Manasam
 Radheshyaam
 Mridugeetham pole

Awards and achievements

Kerala Sangeetha Nataka Akademi Award 2012

Kerala State Film Awards:
 2005 – Best Background Score  - Saira
 2006 – Best Music Director - Rathri Mazha
 2014 – Best Music Director - White Boys
 2015 – Best Music Director - Edavapathy & Ennu Ninte Moideen

Kerala state Television awards
 2000 - Best Music Director -
 2004 - Best Music Director - 'RAGARDHAM'
 2006 - Best Music Director - 
 2012 - Best Music Director - Choodu

Kerala Film Critics Awards
 2002 - Best Music Director - "Megha Malhar"
 2006 - Best Music Director - Rathri Mazha

Kerala Critics TV Awards
 2002 - Best Music Director - "Devaranjini"
 2003 - Best Music Director -

"Madrid International Award"
 2010 - Best Music Director -Veettilekulla vazhi

Madrid International film festival Spain
 "Goldenchakra" award for best music director - Paradesi

"Imagine India 2011 International Award"
 2010 - Best Music Director -Veettilekulla vazhi

Prem Nazir Foundation TV Awards 
 2010 - Best Music Director -
Film Audience Award
 2005 - Best Music Director - 'Sheelabati' and 'Makallkku'

Mathrubhumi Medimix Film Award
 2002 - Best Music Director - "Megha Malhar"
 Limca Book of Records 2014 for continuous vocal recital for 36 hours and has completed 24-hour raga cycle in accordance to the 'samay siddhant', at the Film & Television Institute of India, Pune - is 2013.
Title ‘Nadha Kala Nipuna-2013’ by Ravindran School of Music, Chennai
Title of 'Sangeet Mahayogi' by Uthradom Thirunal Marthanda Varma Foundation, trivandrum - 2012
"Acharya Varishtata" from Pandit Jasraj Institute New York-2011.
"Taan Samrat Award"from Bhavalaya Muscat-2011
"Pt. Bhimsen Joshi Puraskar" from Bharathiya Vidyalaya India-2011
"Leadership Award"from cultural Education Center, New Jersey, United States- 2009
"Sangeet Samraat" Award from Shikshayatan Cultural Center, New York - 2008
"Sangeetha Puraskar" received by the Arts and Cultural Movement Of India - July 2008
Sree Chakra Puraskar 2006.
Virtuoso Award 2005.
Nominated for V. Santharam Award, Mumbai.
John Abraham Award 2001.
Soma Award for the year 2000.
Centre for Media Studies Buddha Award for the year 1998.
Akashavani Annual Award for the year 1997.

References

External links

Official website

1959 births
Hindustani singers
People from Kannur district
Living people
Recipients of the Kerala Sangeetha Nataka Akademi Award